Alexis Elaine Arlitt (born August 25, 1993) is an American soccer player who most recently played as a defender for Utah Royals FC in the NWSL.

Early career
She attended Clear Lake High School in Houston.

College
Arlitt played college soccer for the LSU Tigers from 2011 to 2015.

After an ankle injury forced her to miss all but four matches during the 2014 season, she applied for a medical redshirt, and was granted a fifth year of eligibility for the 2015 season.

Club career

FC Kansas City, 2016–2017
Arlitt was drafted by FC Kansas City in the 4th round of the 2016 NWSL College Draft. She signed with FC Kansas City in April 2016. Arlitt was injured for seven weeks during the 2016 season with a stress reaction in her left fibula. She missed the entire 2017 season with a left knee injury.

Western Sydney Wanderers, 2016–2017 (loan)
In September 2016, Arlitt joined Australian club Western Sydney Wanderers on loan for the 2016–17 W-League season. She played five games for Western Sydney Wanderers, but was then injured and subsequently missed FC Kansas City's season.

Utah Royals FC, 2018
After FC Kansas City ceased operations, Arlitt officially joined the Utah Royals FC on February 12, 2018. Arlitt began the 2018 season on the 45-Day Disabled List (D45) as she was still recovering from a knee injury. On June 21 she was transferred to the Season Ending Injury List (SEI), meaning she would miss the entire NWSL season for the second straight year. On October 1, 2018, Utah declined Arlitt's contract option and she was placed on the Re-Entry Wire, where she was not claimed by another team.

References

External links
LSU Lady Tigers bio
 

1993 births
Living people
American women's soccer players
LSU Tigers women's soccer players
FC Kansas City players
Western Sydney Wanderers FC (A-League Women) players
National Women's Soccer League players
A-League Women players
Expatriate women's soccer players in Australia
FC Kansas City draft picks
Clear Lake High School (Houston, Texas) alumni
Soccer players from Houston
Women's association football defenders
American expatriate sportspeople in Australia
American expatriate women's soccer players
21st-century American women